The 1986–87 Marshall Thundering Herd men's basketball team represented Marshall University during the 1986–87 NCAA Division I men's basketball season. The Thundering Herd, led by fourth-year head coach Rick Huckabay, played their home games at the Cam Henderson Center as members of the Southern Conference. They finished the season 25–6, 15–1 in SoCon play to finish in first place. They defeated Appalachian State, Furman, and Davidson to become champions of the SoCon tournament. They received the SoCon's automatic bid to the NCAA tournament where, as a No. 13 seed, they lost to No. 4 seed TCU in the first round. Marshall's participation in the NCAA Tournament was later vacated by the NCAA.

Roster

Schedule and results

|-
!colspan=8| Regular season
|-

|-
!colspan=8| SoCon tournament

|-
!colspan=8| NCAA tournament

References

Marshall Thundering Herd men's basketball seasons
Marshall
Marshall
Marshall Thundering Herd basketball (men's)
Marshall Thundering Herd basketball (men's)